Cladostigma is a genus of flowering plants belonging to the family Convolvulaceae.

Its native range is Northeastern & Eastern Tropical Africa, Southwestern Arabian Peninsula.

Species:

Cladostigma dioicum 
Cladostigma hildebrandtioides 
Cladostigma nigistiae

References

Convolvulaceae
Convolvulaceae genera